Maskal, born Masiye Kalso Kasaru on November 20, 1985, is a Malawian Afro-R&B singer from Ntcheu. His most popular song is "Udalire". He was nominated in two categories at the Malawian Music Awards (MMA) 2011 – "Best Male" and "Best R&B". He won Best Male Vocal for the MMA 2011.

Career

Early career
He has a diploma in Information Systems from Polytecnic  and worked as an IT officer for the Blantyre Malaria Project.

Music career
He wrote his first song in February 2001. He made his debut on Young Kay's songs, "Utawaleza", "Photobook", and "Mamvelamvela". He was picked up by music promoter Nde'feyo Entertainment.

Since launching his career he has collaborated on songs like "Malawi Goodlife" with Lucius Banda, Black Missionaries, Young Kay and Tigris. He released his first album "Nthawi" in 2010. He has performed at many local concerts and shows. He was the fourth Malawian to perform at Big Brother Africa show.

In 2012, he released two hit singles "Zili ndi iwe, and "Usatope" for the second album "Umunthu" which also included the hit songs such as  "Umamva bwanji", and "Umpeze wina". In 2013 he released another hit single
The Way You are in the UK.

Discography
Nthawi – 2010
Track list:
 Udalire (P. Manyozo, M. Kasaru) – produced by Percy Manyozo
 Kuwala Kwako Feat' Young Kay (P. Manyozo, M. Kasaru, F. Kaphuka) – produced by Percy Manyozo
 Ndimakukonda (P. Manyozo, M. Kasaru) – produced by Percy Manyozo
 Ndamasulidwa (B. Nkata, M. Kasaru) – produced by God's Favorite
 Wa CV Feat' Piksy (G. Pasanje, M. Pasanje, M. Kasaru, E. Zangazanga) – produced by The Daredevilz
 Ndiwe Wanga (P. Manyozo, M. Kasaru) – produced by Percy Manyozo
 Chikondi Sindalama feat. Biriwiri (P. Manyozo, M. Kasaru, K. Munthali, K. Limwame) – produced by Percy Manyozo
 Mtima Wako (P. Manyozo, M. Kasaru) – produced by Percy Manyozo
 Nthawi (S. Kandoje, M. Kasaru) – produced by Sonyezo Kandoje
 Just To Say Hi (S. Beatz, M. Kasaru) – produced by Sannie Beatz
 Hey (B. Nkata, M. Kasaru) – produced by God's Favorite
 Superman (P. Manyozo, M. Kasaru) – produced by Percy Manyozo
 Kuwala Kwako remix feat. Young Kay, Third Eye, BarryOne & Cyclone(P. Manyozo, M. Kasaru, F. Kaphuka, M. Mwanza, B. Mkorongo, P. Mkorongo) – produced by Percy Manyozo
Umunthu – November 2012
Track list:
 Chikondi (P. Manyozo, M. Kasaru) – produced by Percy Manyozo
 Umamva Bwanji? (Y. Nkhwazi, M. Kasaru) – produced by Yesaya Nkhwazi
 Linga Langa (P. Manyozo, M. Kasaru) – produced by Percy Manyozo
 Sindinazolowele (B. Nkata, M. Kasaru) – produced by God's Favorite
 Zili Ndi Iwe (P. Manyozo, M. Kasaru) – produced by Percy Manyozo
 Umpeze Wina (P. Manyozo, M. Kasaru) – produced by Percy Manyozo
 Wampeza (P. Manyozo, M. Kasaru) – produced by Percy Manyozo
 Kudzagwa Mvula (Y. Nkhwazi, M. Kasaru) – produced by Yesaya Nkhwazi
 Usatope (P. Manyozo, M. Kasaru) – produced by Percy Manyozo
 Akanapanda Kudziwa (B. Nkata, M. Kasaru) – produced by God's Favorite

Singles

 - The way You are (Sonny Music productions UK, M.kasaru)- Produced by Sonny
 - Gwiritsa(OBK, M.Kasaru) - Produced by OBK Records
 - Mnyumba mwanga ( OBK, M. Kasaru) - Produced by OBK Records

Awards and nominations
Malawian Music Award 2011 – Winner – "Best Male Vocal"
Malawian Music Award 2011 – Nominee – "Best Male R&B"

References

External links 
 Maskal's Music

21st-century Malawian male singers
Living people
1985 births